The Z Pulsed Power Facility, informally known as the Z machine or Z, is the largest high frequency electromagnetic wave generator in the world and is designed to test materials in conditions of extreme temperature and pressure. It was originally called the PBFA-II and was created in 1985. Since its refurbishment in October 1996 it has been used primarily as an inertial confinement fusion (ICF) research facility.
Operated by Sandia National Laboratories in Albuquerque, New Mexico, it gathers data to aid in computer modeling of nuclear weapons and eventual nuclear fusion pulsed power plants.

History

The Z machine's origins can be traced to the Department of Energy needing to replicate the fusion reactions of a thermonuclear bomb in a lab environment to better understand the physics involved.

Since the 1970s the DoE had been looking into ways to generate electricity from fusion reactions, with continuous reactions such as tokamaks or discrete fusion of small balls of light atoms. Since at the time lasers were far from having the required power, the main approach considered was heavy ion fusion (HIF). However major advances such as Q-switching and mode-locking made lasers an option (culminating in the National Ignition Facility) and the HIF programs became more or less dormant. In 1985, the review of DoE's program by the National Academies stated "The energy crisis is dormant for the time being". HIF machines were tasked to help military research improve nuclear bombs.

The first research at Sandia dates back from 1971 where Gerold Yonas initiated and directed the particle-beam fusion program. Electrons were the first particles to be thought of, because the pulsed power accelerators at the time had already concentrated them at high power in small areas. However, shortly thereafter it was realized that electrons can not possibly heat the fusion fuel rapidly enough for the purpose. The program then moved away from electrons in favor of protons. These turned out to be too light to control well enough to concentrate onto a target, and the program moved on to light ions, lithium. The accelerators names reflect the change in emphasis: first
the accelerator's name was EBFA-I (electron beam fusion accelerator), shortly thereafter PBFA-I, which became Saturn. Protons demanded another accelerator, PBFA-II, which became Z.

In the December 1976 issue of Popular Science and in 1976 conference proceedings published in 1977, an article titled "Particle Beam Fusion Research" described early work and first generation machines: Hydra (1972); Proto I (1975); Proto II (1977); EBFA/PBFA (electronic beam fusion accelerator/particle beam fusion accelerator) (1980).

In 1985, the PBFA-II was created. Sandia continued to target heavy ion fusion at a slow pace despite the National Academies report.

The November 1978 issue of Scientific American carried Yonas' first general-public article, "Fusion power with particle beams".

Meanwhile, defense-related research was also ongoing at Sandia with the Hermes III machine and Saturn (1987), upgraded from PBFA-I, which operated at lower total power than PBFA-II but advanced Sandia's knowledge in high voltage and high current and was therefore a useful predecessor to the Z machine.

In 1996, the US Army published a report on the decommissioning of the Aurora Pulsed Radiation Simulator. This report is useful in understanding ties between nuclear arms testing and inertial fusion energy research.

Also in 1996, the PBFA-II machine was once again upgraded into PBFA-Z or simply "Z machine", described for the first time to the general public in August 1998 in Scientific American.

Physics of the Z machine
The Z machine uses the well known principle of Z-pinch where the fast discharge of capacitors through a tube of plasma causes it to be compressed towards its centerline by the resulting Lorentz forces. Bennet successfully researched the application of Z-pinches to plasma compression. The Z machine layout is cylindrical. On the outside it houses huge capacitors discharging through Marx generators which generate a one microsecond high-voltage pulse. Yonas then uses a system to divide this time by a factor of 10, using the dielectric power of water, to enable the creation of 100 ns discharges.

However this effort was not successful for Heavy Ion Fusion, due to lack of sufficient focusing of the beams, despite the high power used. It had been known for a long time that the Lorentz forces were radial but the current flow was highly unstable and rotated along the cylinder which causes twisting of the imploding tube therefore decreasing the quality of the compression.

A Russian scientist, Valentin Smirnov, then had the idea of replacing the tube (called "liner") with a wire array, to fight the azimuthal flow of the current, and therefore fight the Magnetohydrodynamics (MHD) instability. The Angara V facility of the Kurchatov Institute had been built for the same reason: to help simulate and design the second stage of hydrogen bombs and test the effect of high power x-rays on nuclear missiles' warheads. The space inside the wire array was filled with polystyrene, which helps homogenize the X-ray flux.

Any country developing thermonuclear weapons has its own Z machine, but those not using water lines had long rising pulses (for example 800ns in the Sphinx, the French machine at Gramat). In the UK, the Magpie machine was situated at the Imperial College under control of Malcolm Haines.

By removing the polystyrene core, Sandia was able to obtain a thin 1.5 mm plasma cord in which 10 million amperes flowed with 90 megabars of pressure.

Early operation 1996–2006
The key attributes of Sandia's Z machine are its 18 million amperes and a discharge time of less than 100 nanoseconds. The array of tungsten wires is called a "liner".
In 1999, Sandia tested the idea of nested wire arrays; the second array, out of phase with the first, compensates for Rayleigh-Taylor instabilities.
In 2001, Sandia introduced the Z-Beamlet laser (from surplus equipment of the National Ignition Facility) as a tool to better image the compressing pellet.  This confirmed the shaping uniformity of pellets compressed by the Z machine.

Sandia announced the fusing of small amounts of deuterium in the Z machine on April 7, 2003.

Besides being used as an X-ray generator, the Z machine propelled small plates at 34 kilometers a second, faster than the 30 kilometers per second that Earth travels in its orbit around the Sun, and four times Earth's escape velocity (3 times it at sea level). It also successfully created a special, hyperdense "hot ice" known as ice VII, by quickly compressing water to pressures of 70,000 to 120,000 atmospheres (7 to 12 GPa). Mechanical shock from impacting Z-machine accelerated projectiles is able to melt diamonds.

A good overview of the different missions of the Z machine can be found in the 2002 Trivelpiece committee report which reviewed the pulsed power activities at Sandia.

During this period the power of X-ray produced jumps from 10 to 300TW. In order to target the next milestone of fusion breakeven, another upgrade was then necessary

Prospects 

A $60 million (raised to $90 million) retrofit program called ZR (Z Refurbished) was announced in 2004 to increase its power by 50%. The Z machine was dismantled in July 2006 for this upgrade, including the installation of newly designed hardware and components and more powerful Marx generators. The de-ionized water section of the machine has been reduced to about half the previous size while the oil section has been expanded significantly in order to house larger intermediate storage lines (i-stores) and new laser towers, which used to sit in the water section. The refurbishment was completed in October 2007.
The newer Z machine can now shoot around 26 million amperes (instead of 18 million amperes previously) in 95 nanoseconds. The radiated power has been raised to 350 terawatts and the X-ray energy output to 2.7 megajoules. However the maximum temperature the new version may reach with the same record holder stainless steel wire-array liner used in 2005 is not yet known.

The ultra-high temperatures reached in 2006 (2.66 to 3.7 billion kelvins) are much higher than those required for the classical hydrogen, deuterium and tritium fusion previously considered. They could allow, in theory if not in practice, the fusion of light hydrogen atoms with heavier atoms such as lithium or boron. These two possible fusion reactions do not produce neutrons, and thus no radioactivity or nuclear waste, so they open the possibility of human-made clean aneutronic fusion.

Sandia's roadmap includes another Z machine version called ZN (Z Neutron) to test higher yields in fusion power and automation systems. ZN is planned to give between 20 and 30 MJ of hydrogen fusion power with a shot per hour using a Russian Linear Transformer Driver (LTD) replacing the current Marx generators. After 8 to 10 years of operation, ZN would become a transmutation pilot plant capable of a fusion shot every 100 seconds.

The next step planned would be the Z-IFE (Z-inertial fusion energy) test facility, the first true z-pinch driven prototype fusion power plant. It is suggested it would integrate Sandia's latest designs using LTDs. Sandia Labs recently proposed a conceptual 1 petawatt (1015 watts) LTD Z-pinch power plant, where the electric discharge would reach 70 million amperes. As of 2012, fusion shot simulations at 60 to 70 million amperes are showing a 100 to 1000 fold return on input energy. Tests at the Z machine's current design maximum of 26-27 million amperes were set to begin in 2013.

Z-Pinch Inertial Fusion Energy program

The Sandia Laboratories Z-IFE project aims to solve the practical difficulties in harnessing fusion power. Major problems include producing energy in a single Z-pinch shot, and quickly reloading the reactor after each shot. By their early estimates, an implosion of a fuel capsule every 10 seconds could economically produce 300 MW of fusion energy.

See also
Sandia National Laboratories
Fusion power
Stockpile stewardship
Pulsed power
Inertial fusion power plant
List of plasma (physics) articles
Aneutronic fusion
Magnetized Liner Inertial Fusion

References

External links
Home Page Z Pulsed Power Facility
"A machine called Z", an article from The Observer
Physics News Update, February 28, 2006

Inertial confinement fusion
Nuclear research institutes
Nuclear stockpile stewardship
Military research of the United States
Sandia National Laboratories